William Blackman (27 November 1862 – 2 June 1885) was a cricketer who played first-class cricket for Sussex County Cricket Club. He was educated at Ardingly College and played 34 times for Sussex between 1881 and 1884. Suffering from poor health, he then moved to Melbourne, Australia, where he died of tuberculosis at the age of 22 within a few months.

References

External links
Career statistics - William Blackman

1862 births
1885 deaths
People educated at Ardingly College
Sussex cricketers
People from Arundel
19th-century deaths from tuberculosis
Tuberculosis deaths in Victoria (Australia)